Copidapha is a genus of flies in the family Tabanidae.

Species
Copidapha calabyi (Mackerras, 1960)
Copidapha clavata (Macquart, 1837)
Copidapha gemina (Walker, 1848)
Copidapha roei (Macleay, 1826)
Copidapha subappendiculata (Macquart, 1850)

References

Tabanidae
Brachycera genera
Diptera of Australasia
Taxa named by Günther Enderlein